Cestonia is a genus of bristle flies in the family Tachinidae

Species
Cestonia canariensis Villeneuve, 1936
Cestonia cineraria Rondani, 1861
Cestonia deserticola Richter, 2006
Cestonia grisella Mesnil, 1963
Cestonia harteni Zeegers, 2007
Cestonia lupicolor Richter, 1974
Cestonia rufipes Zeegers, 2007
Cestonia rutilans Villeneuve, 1929

References

Diptera of Asia
Diptera of Africa
Diptera of Europe
Tachinidae genera
Exoristinae
Taxa named by Camillo Rondani